Telangana Telugu, (Telangana slang or Telangana yaasa) often referred to as Hyderabadi Telugu is a dialect of, the Telugu language. It has its own history, spoken mostly in the Indian state of Telangana, as well as neighbouring districts in Karnataka and Maharashtra that were a part of erstwhile Hyderabad State. This dialect, which is spoken in the Hyderabad region, is highly influenced by Hyderabadi Urdu, also called Dakhani or Deccani Urdu.

Evolution 
This dialect has traces from the establishment of Delhi Sultanate in around 1300s. Later other Islam empires such as Tughlaq dynasty, Malik Maqbul Tilangani, Bahmani Sultanate influenced the culture of in the erstwhile Hyderabad and surrounding areas. Qutb Shahi dynasty which was established in 1518, played a key role in shaping the Hyderabadi Telugu. The empire was extended to smaller areas in present-day Maharashtra and Karnataka. This made the introduction of Marathi and Kannada languages in the region. One of the other major reasons for the evolution of the language is the influence of Islam culture who preferred to speak Persian or Urdu languages.

Vocabulary

Unique words 
A few words unique to the Hyderabadi Telugu/Telangana dialect, predominantly spoken by everyone of the region are given below.

Words borrowed from other languages 
A few words borrowed by the Hyderabadi Telugu/Telangana dialect, predominantly spoken in Hyderabad region are given below.

Regional variants 
There are regional variants in the dialect. The dialect spoken by local non Telugu Hyderabadis is influenced by Hyderabadi Urdu. The dialect spoken in interiors of Telangana has localized influences and varies with community. The border regions have mutual influence with languages on other side of the border.

Influence 
The Hyderabadi Telugu/Telangana slang has always influenced the culture of Telangana. The dialect became notable after the Telangana state was formed. It became influential in politics, cinema, economics, arts and other fields that are related to Telangana, besides Standard Telugu.

See also
Deccani language
Hyderabadi Urdu

References 

Telugu dialects
Culture of Telangana
Culture of Hyderabad, India
Languages of Telangana